Swainson's flycatcher (Myiarchus swainsoni) is a species of bird in the family Tyrannidae.
It is found in Argentina, Bolivia, Brazil, Colombia, Ecuador, French Guiana, Guyana, Paraguay, Peru, Suriname, Trinidad and Tobago, Uruguay, and Venezuela.
Its natural habitats are subtropical or tropical dry forests, subtropical or tropical moist lowland forests, and heavily degraded former forest.

References

Swainson's flycatcher
Birds of South America
Swainson's flycatcher
Taxonomy articles created by Polbot